The 1994 United States Senate election in Texas was held November 8, 1994. Incumbent Republican U.S. Senator Kay Bailey Hutchison won re-election to her first full term.

Major candidates

Democratic 
 Richard W. Fisher, businessman and former Special Assistant to Secretary of the Treasury W. Michael Blumenthal
 Michael A. Andrews, U.S. Representative
 Jim Mattox, former Texas Attorney General and former U.S. Representative

Republican 
 Kay Bailey Hutchison, incumbent U.S. Senator

Results

See also 
 1994 United States Senate elections

References 

United States Senate
Texas
1994